LLM Lettering is a set of sans-serif typefaces developed by the Malaysian Highway Authority (LLM) and used for road signage on expressways in Malaysia. The font was divided into two types: LLM Normal (Standard/Regular) and LLM Narrow (Condensed). The LLM Normal typeface is a modified form of the Italian Alfabeto Normale and Alfabeto Stretto. The lettering is special use for the Malaysian Expressway System.

Examples on Malaysian road signs

See also
FHWA Series,  a global format sign font, also used for old format signs in Malaysia
Transport (typeface), used in Europe and for the new format signs of the Public Works Department

References

External links
 Lembaga Lebuhraya Malaysia
 http://blogjalanraya.blogspot.my

Road transport in Malaysia
Sans-serif typefaces
Government typefaces